Ellery Queen is an American TV drama series, developed by Richard Levinson and William Link, who based it on the fictional character of the same name. The series ran for a single season on NBC from September 11, 1975, to April 4, 1976. Jim Hutton stars as the eponymous sleuth, along with David Wayne as his father, Inspector Richard Queen.

Each episode revolves around author Queen investigating a murder, usually with the assistance of his father. The series uses some of the same dramatic devices found in the early Queen novels and radio shows. This includes Hutton breaking the fourth wall, to challenge the viewer to solve the mystery.

Plot
Set in post-World War II New York City (the first episode is set on New Year's Eve of 1946) the show revolved around author and amateur detective Ellery Queen (Jim Hutton), a bachelor who lives with his widowed father, Inspector Richard Queen (David Wayne). Ellery solves cases while writing his latest book, usually with assistance from his father, and Inspector Queen's right-hand-man, Sergeant Velie (Tom Reese).

Similar to the early Queen books and radio episodes, the audience is challenged to solve the mystery. For the television series, this led to Hutton breaking the fourth wall before the confrontation scene. This gave the viewers a short exposition about the case, and leaving the viewer to put together the clues.

The final act always used the detective cliché of calling together all the suspects, with Ellery Queen presenting the solution (except in one episode when the elder Queen took over). The great detective's detailed exposition allowed audience members to assess how they had guessed right and wrong. In some episodes, Queen's explanation disproved the theory of a rival sleuth.

The series departed from the original stories in two respects. An element of mild humour was added by making the Ellery Queen character slightly physically clumsy, and the character of rival radio detective Simon Brimmer (John Hillerman) was created for the series.

Cast
Jim Hutton as Ellery Queen
David Wayne as Inspector Richard Queen
Tom Reese as Sgt. Thomas Velie

Recurring
John Hillerman as Simon Brimmer, a radio host and Queen's frenemy. He frequently competes with Ellery, and jumps to conclusions about the murderer based on one piece of minor evidence.
Ken Swofford as Frank Flannigan, a reporter who competes with Queen on several cases.
Nina Roman as Grace, Inspector Queen's secretary.
Arch Johnson as Deputy Commissioner Hayes, Inspector Queen's boss.
Maggie Nelson as Vera, Frank Flannigan's secretary.

Guest stars

Rene Auberjonois
Don Ameche
Dana Andrews
Eve Arden
Jim Backus
Ken Berry
Lloyd Bochner
Tom Bosley
George Burns
Gretchen Corbett
Joan Collins
William Demarest
Troy Donohue
Rhonda Fleming
Anne Francis
Eva Gabor
Lynda Day George
Larry Hagman
Pat Harrington

Robert Loggia
Guy Lombardo
Nan Martin
Roddy McDowall
Ed McMahon
Ray Milland
Sal Mineo
Dina Merrill
Donald O'Connor
Bert Parks
Walter Pidgeon
Vincent Price
Pernell Roberts
Cesar Romero
Barbara Rush
Dee Wallace
Ray Walston
Betty White

Production
Richard Levinson and William Link had previously written a pilot based on the Ellery Queen character, Ellery Queen: Don't Look Behind You, also produced by Universal. The pilot, directed by Barry Shear, aired as a television movie on NBC on November 19, 1971. Peter Lawford and Harry Morgan had portrayed Ellery and Inspector Queen, respectively, with E. G. Marshall and Stefanie Powers in co-starring roles, and Bill Zuckert as Sgt. Velie. However, Levinson and Link did not like the changes to the script made by producer Leonard Ackerman, and used the pseudonym Ted Leighton as the credited writer. NBC did not order a series from this pilot.

In 1974, Levinson and Link retooled their idea into a new pilot, this time with Jim Hutton and David Wayne as Ellery and Inspector Queen. A television pilot premiered on March 23, 1975, with the made-for-TV movie Ellery Queen: Too Many Suspects. Levinson and Link adapted the script from the 1965 Ellery Queen novel The Fourth Side of the Triangle. NBC ordered a series based on the pilot in May 1975.

A single season of 22 episodes followed. The theme music was by Elmer Bernstein. The last episode aired on April 4, 1976, after which NBC cancelled the series. The series ranked 68 out of 97 shows that season. Levinson and Link later retooled the idea of an author and amateur sleuth who solves murders into the CBS series, Murder, She Wrote.

Reception
Richard Schickel, reviewing the series at its premiere in September 1975, called it "a garage-sale period piece"; he said "the presence of Guy Lombardo, some ancient autos and the oldest of detective story conventions (all suspects are assembled in one room to await the results of the detective's ratiocinations) are supposed to evoke nostalgia. They do not—and the format's stasis is numbing."

In 1979, Levinson and Link won a Special Edgar Award for creating the Columbo and Ellery Queen TV series.

Episodes

Home media
The series, including the pilot, was released on DVD - in Australia (region 4, PAL) on 15 September 2010 and in the US by Entertainment One (region 1, NTSC)  on September 28, 2010. The Australian release also includes Ellery Queen: Don't Look Behind You. In 2016, the complete series of Ellery Queen was released on DVD in the UK. This release also includes Ellery Queen: Don't Look Behind You.

See also 
 The Adventures of Ellery Queen (radio program)

References

External links
 
 William Link from the Museum of Broadcast Communications

1970s American crime drama television series
American detective television series
1970s American mystery television series
1975 American television series debuts
1976 American television series endings
English-language television shows
NBC original programming
Television series by Universal Television
Television series set in the 1940s
Television shows set in New York City
Television series created by William Link
Television series created by Richard Levinson
Ellery Queen